Magdalena Wagnerová (born August 28, 1960) is a Czech writer.

The daughter of photographer Josef Prošek and Irena Wenigová, a translator, she was born in Prague and studied screenwriting and script editing at the Film and TV School of the Academy of Performing Arts in Prague. She works as an editor.

Wagnerová has written short stories for children, radio plays and scripts for film and television. Her preferred genre is the fairy tale. She wrote scripts for the Czech film and television series Saturnin and for the televised fairy tale Hořké víno.

She was dramaturge for the international Winton Train memorial project, which culminated on September 4, 2009 at Liverpool Street Station in London with the meeting of the then hundred-year-old Sir Nicholas Winton with some of the Jewish children he had rescued.

Since 1995 Wagnerová has mainly worked as a writer of books. In 2000, together with Ivan Beránek, František Drtikol and Pavel Štefan, she founded a non-commercial book publishing house Havran, where she works as an editor and mainly publishes modern European prose in the Kamikaze edition.

Selected works 
 Proč? Pohádky o rybách, ptácích a jiných zvířatech (Why? Stories about Fish, Birds and Other Animals), story collection (2001)
 Proto! Pohádky o muchomůrkách, pečených husách a jiných důležitých věcech (Here's why! Stories about Toadstools, Roast Goose and Other Important Things), story collection (2002)
 Srdce pohádek, story collection (2002), classic fairy tales retold
 Pohádky z vodních hlubin, story collection (2004), world folklore
 Pohádky z moře, story collection (2004), world folklore
 Papíří, novel (2005)
 Karel aneb Pohádka o našem deštníku, illustrated story (2005),  Eva Koupová illustrator
 Krajina nedělní, novel (2010)
 Krys Veliký, illustrated story (2010), Tereza Tydlitátová illustrator

References

External links 
 

1960 births
Living people
Czech women novelists
Czech women dramatists and playwrights
Czech women short story writers
Czech short story writers
Czech women children's writers
Czech children's writers
Czech screenwriters
Czech women screenwriters
21st-century Czech women writers
21st-century Czech novelists
21st-century Czech dramatists and playwrights
21st-century short story writers
21st-century screenwriters